Thomas Scott (born 18 February 1964) is an English singer, songwriter and musician. He is the lead singer and guitarist of the Liverpool band Space. Scott started out as the band's bassist, but switched to guitar after David "Yorkie" Palmer joined in 1997, partly so that he could concentrate on vocals. Prior to Space, he has played in various Liverpool bands, such as the Substitutes (with Jamie Murphy), Hello Sunset and the Australians (with Franny Griffiths, who later became Space's keyboardist). Following Space's original breakup in 2005, Scott formed The Drellas, which in 2011 morphed into the current line-up of Space after Griffiths rejoined the band.

On 22 November 2020, Scott released his debut solo album Marionette under the moniker The Thomas Scott Quintet.

Biography
Scott was born in Liverpool. He lived in Everton until he was five, when his family moved to the Cantril Farm Estate, now Stockbridge Village. Scott's father, a former Ford factory worker, died of cancer in 1995, an event which would later inspire "Avenging Angels". Scott grew up with a love of films, rock and roll and punk, all of which has informed his writing.

Around the early 1980s, Scott enrolled on a course for unemployed musicians in Northern England, alongside Mike Badger, John Power and Lee Mavers, all of whom would later become members of The La's. In 1984, Scott formed his first group, Porcelain Touch, whose lineup included keyboard player Franny Griffiths, who later changed their name to Hello Sunset. By 1987, Hello Sunset had morphed into The Australians, and their songs "Sadie" and "The Girl Who Loved Her Man Enough Too Kill Him" were included on the Vinyl Virgins and Hit the North compilations, respectively.

In 1992, Scott formed Space with Jamie Murphy and Andy Parle, with Griffiths joining a year later. 
When the band toured the United States for the first time in 1997, Scott lost his voice for two months due to stress, and the band subsequently had to cancel their tour. Scott stated that after trying numerous kinds of therapies and cures, he saw a psychic, Billy Roberts, who was able to predict the exact date his voice would come back.

Space split in 2005, and Scott formed the Drellas, the original line-up of which included Space's then drummer Leon Caffrey, and Phil Hartley — who had previously worked with Space as a producer and technician — on bass. The Drellas then morphed into Tommy Scott & the Red Scare, featuring Scott, Hartley and two new members, Allan Jones (drums) and Ryan Clarke (keyboards), as well as a saxophone player. Hartley, Jones and Clarke would all later join the new line-up of Space, when the band reformed in 2011, following the death of Andy Parle two years earlier. Both Scott and Murphy admitted to having fallen out with each other, but were on amicable terms by the time the band reunited.

On 22 November 2020, Scott released his debut solo album Marionette under the moniker The Thomas Scott Quintet.

Influences
Although Scott cites films and cartoons such as Speedy Gonzales as his main influences, musically, his influences include Cypress Hill, Frank Sinatra, Elvis Presley – as referenced in 'A Liddle Biddy Help From Elvis', from Tin Planet – and the Slits. As a teenager, he frequented Eric's and saw several bands that would go on to influence him, such as the Au Pairs and Spizz Energi.

Equipment
Scott has used the following equipment:
 Framus bass
 Vox Teardrop bass
 Fender Coronado guitar
 1972 Tiesco guitar
 1969 Audition Sunburst guitar
 1976 Starway Sunburst guitar
 Farida GNA-80 guitar
 1965 EKO 500/4V guitar
 Vox AC30 amplifier
 Fender Pro Reverb amplifier
 Echoman Delay pedal
 Ibanez Tube Screamer pedal
 VHT Combo amplifier
 Danelectro Tape Echo pedal

References

External links
Official Space website
The Thomas Scott Quintet

1964 births
Living people
20th-century English singers
21st-century English singers
Alternative rock singers
English rock guitarists
English bass guitarists
English male guitarists
Male bass guitarists
English rock singers
Musicians from Liverpool
20th-century bass guitarists
21st-century British guitarists
21st-century British male singers
20th-century British male singers